Giovanni Antonio Angrisani, C.R. (1560–1641) was a Roman Catholic prelate who served as Archbishop of Sorrento (1612–1641).

Biography
Giovanni Antonio Angrisani was born in 1560 in Naples, Italy and ordained a priest in the Congregation of Clerics Regular of the Divine Providence.
On 4 Jun 1612, he was appointed during the papacy of Pope Paul V as Archbishop of Sorrento.
On 11 Jun 1612, he was consecrated bishop by Felice Centini, Bishop of Mileto, with Giovanni Battista del Tufo, Bishop Emeritus of Acerra, and Paolo de Curtis, Bishop Emeritus of Isernia, serving as co-consecrators. 
He served as Archbishop of Sorrento until his death on 29 Aug 1641.

While bishop, he was the principal co-consecrator of Pier Luigi Carafa (seniore), Bishop of Tricarico (1624).

References

External links and additional sources
 (for Chronology of Bishops) 
 (for Chronology of Bishops)  

17th-century Italian Roman Catholic archbishops
Bishops appointed by Pope Paul V
Theatine bishops
Clergy from Naples
1560 births
1641 deaths